The pygmy swiftlet (Collocalia troglodytes) is a species of swift in the family Apodidae. It is endemic to the Philippines.

Its natural habitat is subtropical or tropical moist lowland forests. At under , it is the world's smallest swift. It weighs only 5 grams.

Swiftlets that nest in complete darkness in caves can use echolocation, the ability to position an object by reflected sound, used by other animals such as dolphins and bats.

References

 Price, J. J., Johnson, K. P., & Clayton, D. H. (2004). The Evolution of echolocation in Swiftlets. Journal of Avian Biology 35(2), 135–143. doi: 10.1111/j.0908-8857.2004.03182.x
 Thomassen, H. A., Den Tex, R., De Bakker, M., & Povel, G. (2005). Phylogenetic relationship among Swifts and Swiflets . Molecular Phylogenetics and Evolution, 37(1), 264–277. doi: 10.1016/j.ympev.2005.05.010

pygmy swiftlet
Endemic birds of the Philippines
pygmy swiftlet
pygmy swiftlet
Taxonomy articles created by Polbot